Mahmoud Ezzat (born 5 May 1992) is an Egyptian football player who currently plays as a center back for Smouha and the Egyptian national team. He was called for the national team under Shawky Gharib on 4 June 2014 in a friendly game against Jamaica.

Ezzat played for C.D. Nacional in the Primeira Liga.

References

1992 births
Living people
Egyptian footballers
Egypt youth international footballers
Egypt international footballers
Egyptian expatriate footballers
Expatriate footballers in Portugal
Egyptian expatriate sportspeople in Portugal
Primeira Liga players
C.D. Nacional players
Association football defenders
Egyptian Premier League players